The 40th edition of the International Rostrum of Composers took place from May 9–13, 1994. It was the third time in a row a Finnish composer won the senior category.

Recommended Works
  Thomas Adès - Living Toys
  Mogens Christensen - Winter Light
  Frédéric Durieux - Marges III
  Heiner Goebbels - Ou Bien le Débarquement Désastreux
  Eero Hämeenniemi - Nattuvannar
  Chris Harman - Concerto for Oboe and Strings
  Jouni Kaipainen - Carpe Diem!
  Yoshihiro Kanno - The Time of Mirrors
  Stanisław Krupowicz - Fin de Siècle
  Hanspeter Kyburz - Cells
  Paweł Szymański - Miserere

Under-30 Category
  Thomas Adès - Living Toys
  Chris Harman - Concerto for Oboe and Strings
  Eric Tanguy - Jubilate

References
 International Music Council

International Rostrum of Composers